Three ships of the United States Navy have been named Courier, after a courier, a messenger or traveling attendant.

 , a storeship purchased 7 September 1861.
 ,  a ferry launch, formerly named Hope, which served as commandant's barge and general service ship at Charleston Navy Yard from 1912 to 1918.
 , a coastal minesweeper which served in "in service" status in the 1st Naval District from 1941 to 1947.
 , A cargo ship launched in 1962 and scrapped in 2008

United States Navy ship names